Star Square, Square-alley in the center of Moscow in the Tverskoy District near Moskvoretskaya Embankment.

Description 
Alley is located in the center of Moscow, on the side of the Zaryadye. Modeled on Hollywood's "Walk of Fame" and on the idea of its instigators must be the most prominent figures of contemporary Russian popular culture.

Stars on the Star Square

 Mark Bernes - 1993
 Leonid Utyosov - 1993
 Vladimir Vysotsky - 1993 
 Klavdiya Shulzhenko - 1993
 Lidia Ruslanova - 1993 
 Izabella Yurieva - 1993
 Vadim Kozin - 1993
 Viktor Tsoi - 1993
 Boris Brunov - 1997
 Yuri Antonov - 1997
 Irina Ponarovskaya - 1997
 Makhmud Esambayev - 1997
 Valery Leontiev - 1998
 Alexander Tsfasman - 1998
 Nikita Bogoslovsky - 1998
 Edita Piekha - 1998
 Alexander Vertinsky - 1998
 Vladimir Vinokur - 1998
 Vyacheslav Dobrynin - 1998
 Gelena Velikanova - 1998
 Igor Krutoy - 1998
 Nikolai Slichenko - 1998
 Vasily Solovyov-Sedoi - 1998
 Mikhail Tanich - 1998
 Ilya Reznik - 1998
 "Na-Na" - 1998
 MVD Ensemble - 1998
 Joachim Sharoev - 1998
 Boris Krasnov - 1998
 Pyotr Leshchenko - 1998
 Maria Mironova and Alexander Menaker - 1999
 Andrei Mironov - 1999
 Lev Leshchenko - 1999
 Oscar Feltsman - 1999
 Alexander Malinin - 1999
 Vakhtang Kikabidze - 1999
 Oleg Gazmanov - 1999 
 Igor Luchenok - 1999 
 The ensemble "Orera" - 1999
 Polad Bülbüloğlu - 2000
 Ludmila Ryumina - 2000
 Arkady Raikin - 2001
 Vladimir Mulyavin and ensemble "Pesniary" - 2001
 Pyatnitsky Choir - 2001
 Oleg Lundstrom - 2001
 Nani Bregvadze - 2001
 Yevgeny Martynov - 2001
 Arno Babajanyan - 2001
 Andrei Petrov - 2001
 Valery Obodzinsky - 2002
 Alexander Zatsepin - 2002
 Maya Kristalinskaya - 2002
 Yuri Saulsky - 2002
 Leonid Derbenyov - 2002
 Andrei Dementyev - 2002
 Vladimir Migulya - 2002
 Alexander Alexandrov - 2003
 Matvey Blanter - 2003
 Anatoly Novikov - 2003
 Sofia Rotaru - 2003
 Anna German - 2003
 Alla Bayanova - 2003
 Anatoly Kroll - 2003
 Vladimir Troshin - 2003
 Eduard Kolmanovsky - 2003
 Arkady Ostrovsky - 2004
 Yevgeny Krylatov - 2004
 Alexander Morozov - 2004
 Mikhail Finberg - 2004
 Yuri Vizbor - 2004
 Georgy Garanian - 2004
 Tamara Miansarova - 2004
 Irina Allegrova - 2004
 Igor Bril - 2004
 Roza Rymbaeva - 2005
 Maksim Dunayevsky - 2005
 Mark Fradkin - 2005
 Boris Mokrousov - 2005
 Serafim Tulikov - 2005
 Alexander Zhurbin - 2005
 The show group "Doctor Watson" - 2005
 Eugene Ptichkin - 2005
 Syabry - 2006
 Shandor
 Igor Yung
 Edward Smolny
 Lev Oshanin
 Yuri Silant'ev
 Moskovskij Komsomolets
 Europa Plus

References
 Stars on the Star Square

External links
 On Google Maps

Streets in Moscow
Tverskoy District